Lentegeur is a neighbourhood located within the Mitchells Plain urban area of the City of Cape Town in the Western Cape province of South Africa. It is located in the north eastern section of the Mitchells Plain area. The 400 bed Mitchells Plain Hospital, one of Cape Town's larger hospitals, is located in the neighbourhood. The Lentegeur Sports Grounds dominate central area of the neighbourhood.

Educational institutions in the neighbourhood include: 
Lentegeur Secondary School 
Aloe High School 
West End Primary School
Springdale Primary School
Merrydale Primary School
Hyacinth Primary School
Meadowridge Primary School
Latana Primary School
Cornflower Primary School

References 

Suburbs of Cape Town